The Mixed 10 m platform synchro competition of the 2018 European Aquatics Championships was held on 11 August 2018.

Results
The final was started at 15:30.

References

Mixed 10 m platform synchro
European Aquatics Championships